Moises Flores (born November 17, 1986) is a Mexican professional boxer who is a former WBA interim and IBO super bantamweight champion.

Professional career

Moises flores turned professional in 2008 and compiled a record of 22-0 (1 NC) before he won the WBA interim title at Super bantamweight by beating Colombia boxer Óscar Escandón. The World Boxing Association mandated a fight between Flores and full champion Guillermo Rigondeaux, in the fight Flores would be knocked out in the 1st round. The result of the fight would however be overturned to a no contest as the knockout blow was deemed to have landed after the bell.

In his next fight, Flores was slated to challenge Daniel Roman for his WBA super bantamweight belt. However, Flores failed to make weight, and even though the fight was still on, the title was not on the line for Flores. Roman won the fight convincingly, while punishing Flores with body shots in the process.

After that, Flores faced Brandon Figueroa in a WBA super bantamweight eliminator. Figueroa had a great start, and managed to drop Flores twice in the third round, the second time ending the fight with 1:35 to go.

Professional boxing record

References

External links

Premier Boxing Champions Profile
Moises Flores - Profile, News Archive & Current Rankings at Box.Live

 

1986 births
Living people
Sportspeople from Guadalajara, Jalisco
Boxers from Jalisco
Mexican male boxers
Super-bantamweight boxers
International Boxing Organization champions